Hottinger Collection – formed in New York City by Henry Hottinger (4 February 1885 in New York, NY – 19 March 1979 in Stamford, CT).

Henry Hottinger  was  a founder and member of Wertheim & Co., a firm of Investment Bankers. Hottinger's interest in musical instruments led to him amassing what some regard as some of the best-known collection of rare violins of the mid-20th century.

Hottinger purchased his first violin, a stradivari, in 1935. For his collection, he strove to find the most 'outstanding examples' of Cremonese masters, and in the case of Stradivari and Guarneri ‘del Gesù’, one example from each significant period of their production.

In 1967 an illustrated catalogue titled:  R. Wurlitzer: The Henry Hottinger Collection was published following the collection's sale to Rembert Wurlitzer Co, one of the most well established string instrument dealerships of the time. 
30 violins in all were subsequently dispersed across the world.

Quotes

"...... One of the great violin collectors of all time." - Cozio.com

References

  Cozio.com
 The Henry Hottinger Collection - Rembert Wurlitzer, 1967
 "The Henry Hottinger Collection", The Strad, October, 1965.
 Capolavori di Antonio Stradivari, Charles Beare, Arnoldo Mondadori S.p.A., Milan, 1987.
 A Thousand Mornings of Music, Arnold Gingrich, Crown Publishers, New York, 1970.
 Antonius Stradivarius, Dirk J. Balfoort, The Continental Book Company, Stockholm, 1945.
 Berühmte Geigen und ihre Schicksale, P. J. Tonger, Köln, 1919.
 Die Geigen und Lautenmacher vom Mitteralter bis zur Gegenwart, Willibald Leo von Lütgendorff, Frankfurter Verlags-Anstalt, Frankfurt am Main, 1922.  
 Italian Violin Makers, Karel Jalovec, Paul Hamlyn, London, 1964.
 Italian Violin-Makers, Karel Jalovec, Orbis, Prague, 1952.
 Italienische Geigenbauer (1957), Karel Jalovec, Artia, Prague, 1957.
 Loan Exhibition of Stringed Instruments and Bows Commemorating the 70th Birthday of Simone Fernando Sacconi, Schuler Verlagsgesellschaft, Stuttgart, 1966.
 Meisterwerke Italienischer Geigenbaukunst, Fridolin Hamma, Hamma & Co., 1932.
 The 'Secrets' of Stradivari, Simone F. Sacconi, Eric Blot Edizioni, Cremona, 2000.
 The Violin: Its physical and acoustic principles, Paolo Peterlongo, Paul Elek, London, 1979.  
 Violin Iconography of Antonio Stradivari 1644–1737, Herbert K. Goodkind, Larchmont, New York, 1972.  
 "Eighteenth-Century Connections Through Musical Instruments", Gary Sturm, Journal of The Violin Society of America, Vol. IX, No. 2, 1988.
 How Many Strads?, Ernest N. Doring, 1945.
 "Exhibition of Violins and Bows in the Smithsonian Collection", Gary Sturm, Journal of The Violin Society of America, Vol. V, No. 2, Spring, 1979.
 "Guided Tour of the Library of Congress Collection of Stringed Instruments", Robert Bein, Journal of The Violin Society of America, Volume XVII, No. 2, November 4–7, 1999.
 La Casa Nuziale: The Home of Antonio Stradivari, 1667–1680, Arnaldo Baruzzi, W. E. Hill & Sons, London, 1962.
 "Ne Plus Ultra", John Dilworth, The Strad, December, 1987.
 36 Famous Italian Violins, Alex Wasinski, Herman Gordon, New York, 1975.
 Capolavori di Antonio Stradivari, Charles Beare, Arnoldo Mondadori S.p.A., Milan, 1987.
 Evelyn & Herbert Axelrod Stringed Instrument Collection, Herbert Axelrod, 2002.
 "Poster supplement", The Strad, September, 1987.
 Italian Violin-Makers, Karel Jalovec, Orbis, Prague, 1952.
 Beautiful Italian Violins, Karel Jalovec, Paul Hamlyn, London, 1963.
 Antonius Stradivarius, Cremona 1679, Ex-Hellier, Machold Rare Violins.
 The Miracle Makers, Bein & Fushi, Chicago, 1998.
 We Love Stradivari, NHK, 1988.
 "Antonio Stradivari 'Hellier' 1679", Roger Hargrave, The Strad, September, 1987.

External links
  Wurlitzer, Rembert
 Wurlitzer
 D’Attili, Dario
Simone Fernando Sacconi
https://web.archive.org/web/20080623041215/http://www.soundpostonline.com/archive/spring2002/page4.htm
 CHARLES BEARE

Violins
American collectors